Jacob Bachmeier (born January 29, 1998) is an American politician who served in the Montana House of Representatives from 2017 through 2021. A member of the Democratic Party, Bachmeier became the youngest person ever to be elected to the Montana House of Representatives, and at the time was the youngest public officeholder in the United States.

Biography
Bachmeier graduated from Havre High School and attended Montana State University–Northern.

Bachmeier announced his run for the House in November 2015 when he was a senior in high school. He turned 18 in January 2016, making him an eligible candidate for Montana public office, and picked fellow student Daniel Almas as his campaign manager.

Bachmeier was elected with 53% of the vote, defeating incumbent Republican Stephanie Hess. He was reelected in 2018 with 59% of the vote. He also serves as Chair of the Hill County Democratic Central Committee.

In January 2020, Bachmeier announced he would not run for a third term.

Personal life
Bachmeier is a Christian. His great-grandfather, Charles Manuel, also served in the Montana Legislature.

Electoral history

References

1998 births
Living people
Montana State University–Northern alumni
Democratic Party members of the Montana House of Representatives
People from Havre, Montana
21st-century American politicians
Christians from Montana